Christian Tyrer (born 19 December 1973) is a professional rugby league and rugby union footballer who played in the 1990s.

Club career
Tyrer made his debut for Widnes Vikings in 1993 against St Helens.

Personal life
Christian Tyrer is the son of the rugby league footballer; Colin Tyrer, and the brother of the rugby league footballer who played in the 1980s and 1990s for Wigan, Oldham and Whitehaven; Sean/Shaun Tyrer.

References

External links
 (archived by web.archive.org) Statistics at rugby.widnes.tv

1973 births
Living people
Bath Rugby players
English rugby league players
English rugby union players
Footballers who switched code
Keighley Cougars players
Place of birth missing (living people)
Rugby league five-eighths
Widnes Vikings players